Bryce Campbell may refer to:

 Bryce Campbell (Australian footballer) (born 1984), an Australian rules football player
 Bryce Campbell (rugby union) (born 1994), an American rugby union player